Andrzej Potocki (1618–1663) was a Polish noble.

He was Obozny of the Crown since 1665, voivode of Bracław Voivodeship since 1662 and starost of Winnica.

Andrzej Potocki married his cousin Wiktoria Elżbieta Potocka.

1618 births
1663 deaths
Andrzej Potocki